Intelsat 709 (also known as IS-709 and Intelsat 7-F9) is a geostationary Communications satellite that was built by Space Systems/Loral (SSL). It is located in the orbital position of 47.5° west longitude. The satellite is owned by Intelsat. The satellite was based on the LS-1300 platform and its estimated useful life was 15 years.

The Intelsat 709 is equipped with 26 transponders in C-band and 10 in Ku-band to provide broadcasting, business-to-home services, telecommunications, VSAT networks.

See also 

 1996 in spaceflight

External links 
 Intelsat 709 TBS satellite
 Intelsat 709 SatBeams

References 

Spacecraft launched in 1996
Intelsat satellites